It Comes at Night is a 2017 American psychological horror film written and directed by Trey Edward Shults. It stars Joel Edgerton, Christopher Abbott, Carmen Ejogo, Kelvin Harrison Jr., and Riley Keough. The film focuses on a family hiding in a forest as the Earth is taken over by a highly contagious disease.

The film had its premiere at the Overlook Film Festival at Timberline Lodge in Oregon on April 29, 2017, and was theatrically released on June 9, 2017 in the United States, by A24. It was positively received by critics but less well received by the general public, and grossed over $20 million worldwide.

Plot
A highly contagious disease ravages the planet. A couple, Paul and Sarah, and their teenage son Travis are secluded in their home deep in the woods in an undisclosed location. After Sarah's father, Bud, contracts the disease, they kill him, and burn his body in a shallow grave.

That night, they capture an intruder breaking into the house. Paul ties him to a tree, and places a bag over his head overnight to confirm he is not suffering from the disease. The stranger, Will, explains he did not know the house was occupied, and was searching for fresh water for his wife and his young son. Will offers to trade some of their food for water. Sarah suggests bringing the strangers to their home, reasoning the more people, the easier it would be to defend themselves, if and when necessary. Paul reluctantly agrees, and drives Will to collect his family. Along the way, they are ambushed by two men. Paul kills them, while accusing Will of setting him up. Will explains he fought them, and assuages Paul's mistrust.

Paul returns with Will, his wife Kim, and son Andrew. After establishing the rules Paul and Sarah use to stay safe, including a) keeping the only entrance locked with a key Paul or Sarah wear around their neck, and b)  keeping nighttime excursions to a minimum, the two families establish a sense of normality, and grow closer.

One day, Travis's dog Stanley begins barking aggressively at an unseen presence and chases it into the woods. Travis follows the dog into the woods before Stanley's barking suddenly ceases. Travis insists to Paul and Will he heard something in the woods. They return home after Paul assures Travis that Stanley knows the woods and will find his way home. That night, Will seemingly contradicts a story he told Paul earlier about his and Kim's activities prior to finding the abandoned house. Paul's response suggests an increasing distrust of Will.

That evening, Travis discovers Andrew sleeping on the floor of Bud's old room suffering from a nightmare. Travis leads him back to his parents' room before hearing a sound from downstairs. Travis finds the front door of the house is slightly open, and he hears noises. He wakes the others. They investigate, finding a bleeding and gravely-sick Stanley on the floor. They kill and burn the dog. After Travis reveals the door was open before he came downstairs, Sarah suggests sleepwalking Andrew opened the door. Kim argues the possibility as tensions rise. Paul suspects Andrew is infected, and decides they should quarantine in their separate rooms for a couple of days so they can calm down and ensure no one is sick. That evening, Travis is awakened by a nightmare about his grandfather.

The next morning, Travis overhears Andrew crying constantly. A distraught Kim tells Will they need to leave. Travis informs his parents Andrew might be infected, and, as such, he too may be infected. Paul and Sarah don protective masks and gloves, and take weapons to confront Kim and Will. After Paul asks to be let in to see if Andrew is sick, Will draws a gun and takes Paul captive. Will insists his family is healthy, repeatedly tells Andrew to keep his eyes shut and orders Paul to remove the mask. Will demands Paul give him "...a fair share..." of food and water so they can leave. Sarah and Paul overwhelm Will, and force him and his family outside.  Will attacks Paul, and tries to beat him to death until Sarah shoots Will in the back. He dies from his wound. Kim flees into the woods with Andrew. Paul fires at them, killing Andrew, and then fires again to kill Kim.

Later, Travis awakens in bed, visibly sick. His mother comforts him as he dies. Paul and Sarah, now visibly infected, sit at the dinner table in silence. They share a shattered, devastated look.

Cast

 Joel Edgerton as Paul, Sarah’s husband and Travis’s father
 Christopher Abbott as Will, Kim’s husband and Andrew’s father
 Carmen Ejogo as Sarah, Paul’s wife, Travis’s mother and Bud’s daughter
 Riley Keough as Kim, Will’s wife and Andrew’s mother
 Kelvin Harrison Jr. as Travis, Paul and Sarah’s son and Bud’s grandson
 Griffin Robert Faulkner as Andrew, Will and Kim’s son
 David Pendleton as Bud, Sarah's father and Travis’s grandfather
 Mickey as Stanley, the family dog
 Chase Joliet and Mick O'Rourke as men who attack Paul and Will

Production
Shults began writing the film after the death of his father as a way of dealing with the pain. He cites Pieter Bruegel the Elder’s 1562 oil painting The Triumph of Death as inspiration and it features prominently in the movie and its first trailer. Although the film is post-apocalyptic Shults did not look to any other such films as inspiration; instead, he cited the work of Paul Thomas Anderson and John Cassavetes and the films Night of the Living Dead and The Shining as inspirations. To the later point, the film takes some influences from The Shinings Overlook Hotel in that the layout of the house is deliberately vague and never properly established. Shults has described it "as this kind of labyrinth" and a metaphor for "the mesh of Travis' head".

In June 2016, Joel Edgerton joined the cast of the film. In August 2016, it was announced that Christopher Abbott, Riley Keough and Carmen Ejogo had also joined the cast.

Filming
Principal photography began in August 2016 in New York.

Release
The film had its world premiere at Overlook Film Festival at Timberline Lodge, Oregon, on April 29, 2017. The film was scheduled to be released on August 25, 2017, but was rescheduled for June 9, 2017.

Box office
It Comes at Night grossed $14 million in the United States and Canada and $5.7 million in other territories for a worldwide total of $19.7 million.

It Comes at Night was released alongside The Mummy and Megan Leavey, and was expected to gross around $7 million from 2,533 theaters in its opening weekend, with a chance of making as much as $12 million. It made $700,000 from Thursday night previews and $2.4 million on its first day. It ended up debuting to $6 million, finishing 6th at the box office. Deadline Hollywood noted the film's poor audience word-of-mouth led to a drop of potential Saturday and Sunday sales.

Critical response
On Rotten Tomatoes, the film holds an approval rating of 88% based on 252 reviews, with an average rating of 7.4/10. The site's critical consensus reads, "It Comes at Night makes lethally effective use of its bare-bones trappings while proving once again that what's left unseen can be just as horrifying as anything on the screen." On Metacritic, the film has a weighted average score 78 out of 100, based on 43 critics, indicating "generally favorable reviews". Audiences polled by CinemaScore gave the film an average grade of "D" on an A+ to F scale.

Brian Tallerico of RogerEbert.com gave the film a thumbs up, saying "It is a movie in which the villains are loss, grief, pain, fear and distrust — very human emotions — and it has no traditional brain-eaters." He added that "it is one of the most terrifying films in years".

Accolades 
Kelvin Harrison Jr. was nominated for Breakthrough Actor at the Gotham Independent Film Awards 2017.

See also 
 Retreat, a film with some similar details in its plot.

References

External links
 
 
 
 
 
 

2017 films
2017 horror films
2010s psychological horror films
2017 horror thriller films
American horror thriller films
American psychological horror films
American psychological thriller films
Apocalyptic films
American post-apocalyptic films
Films about viral outbreaks
A24 (company) films
Films directed by Trey Edward Shults
American independent films
2017 independent films
Films set in forests
2010s English-language films
2010s American films